Haluoleo Airport (formerly Wolter Monginsidi Airport) is an airport in Kendari, South East Sulawesi, Indonesia . The previous name of the airport was named for Robert Wolter Monginsidi (1925–1949), an Indonesian national hero who was executed by the Dutch during the Indonesian National Revolution. Since February 13, 2010, the airport is renamed to honor Buton Sultanate's sixth sultan, Halu Oleo. The new terminal was opened on 6 April 2012.

Haluoleo service has experienced some service improvement, especially in the presence of 3 aerobridge facilities that facilitate passengers entering the terminal region of departure and arrival airports and heading to and from the aircraft. The airport's apron is now also undergoing expansion and can accommodate eight wide-body aircraft in its class such as the Boeing 737-900ER and Airbus A320.

Currently, Haluoleo service is being pursued as a transit airport for flights in eastern Indonesia, in addition to Hasanuddin Airport Makassar, which is very congested. It is hoped that in the future, with transit in the airport, aircraft operating costs can be reduced because it can save fuel.

Expansions
In 2011, the apron was expanded from 195x91 square meter to 234x113 square meter. The runway is still being expanded from 2,250 meters to 2,500 meters and completed at the end of 2012.In 2023 Haluoleo Airport Runway will be revitalized from 2,500 meters to 3,100 meters to become an International standard airport .

Airlines and destinations

Passenger

cargo

Facilities
It has one runway designated 08/26 with an asphalt surface measuring 2,500 m x 45 m (8,202 ft × 148 ft).

Ground transportation
Transport from Haluoleo Airport to Kendari City center is possible through the following options:
 Taxi
As with other airports in Indonesia, there is also a taxi service in the airport. For the distance from the airport to the city of Kendari itself is about ± 25 kilometers and takes about 30 to 40 minutes. The taxi fare is around Rp. 100,000 using the taximeter (varies depending on your final destination).
 Bus
Perum DAMRI operates services between the airport and the harbor. The service began from 30 September 2016. The cost is Rp. 30,000 from the airport to the harbor and vice versa.
 Other services
Alternative transportation is to use transport rent (travel), while the charge for mileage from Haluoleo Airport to Kendari city center is around Rp. 60,000 up to Rp. 80,000 per person. Price is negotiable. The vehicle is a minibus and it is more suitable for those coming in groups and carry a lot of luggage.

References

External links
 Haluoleo Airport - Indonesia Airport Global Website

Airports in Southeast Sulawesi